Raven Klaasen and Nathaniel Lammons defeated Nicolás Barrientos and Miguel Ángel Reyes-Varela in the final, 6–1, 7–5 to win the men's doubles tennis title at the 2022 Korea Open.

This was the first edition of an ATP Tour event in Seoul since 1996.

This was 2017 Next Generation ATP Finals champion and 2018 Australian Open semifinalist Chung Hyeon's first ATP tour event since the 2020 French Open qualifying event. Partnering compatriot Kwon Soon-woo, he reached the semifinals.

Seeds

Draw

Draw

References

External links 
Main draw

Korea Open - Doubles
2022 Men's Doubles